The 2014–15 Virginia Tech Hokies men's basketball team represented Virginia Polytechnic Institute and State University during the 2014–15 NCAA Division I men's basketball season. They were led by first year head coach Buzz Williams and played their home games at Cassell Coliseum. They were a member of the Atlantic Coast Conference. They finished the season 11–21, 2–16 in ACC play to finish in last place. They advanced to the second round of the ACC tournament where they lost to Miami (FL).

Last season
The Hokies finished the season 11–22, 2–16 in ACC play to finish in last place. After defeating Wake Forest in the first round, they lost in the second round of the ACC tournament to Miami (FL).

Departures

Incoming Transfers

Recruiting class

Roster

Schedule

|-
!colspan=12 style="background:#660000; color:#CC5500;"| Regular season

|-
!colspan=9 style="background:#660000; color:#CC5500;"| ACC tournament

References

Virginia Tech Hokies men's basketball seasons
Virginia Tech
Virginia Tech Hokies men's basketball
Virginia Tech